Fahad Ghazi Zahem (born 1 March 1994) is a Saudi footballer who plays for Al-Ettifaq as a left-back .

External links

References

1994 births
Living people
Saudi Arabian footballers
Saudi Arabia youth international footballers
Al Hilal SFC players
Al-Shabab FC (Riyadh) players
Ettifaq FC players
Saudi Professional League players
Association football fullbacks